John Featherstone Ockerby (1864 – 1 July 1951) was an Australian politician. He was born in Dewsbury in Yorkshire. He was Mayor of Launceston in Tasmania in 1925 and 1939. In 1928 he was elected to the Tasmanian House of Assembly as a Nationalist member for Bass, serving until his defeat in 1946. Ockerby died in Launceston in 1951.

References

1864 births
1951 deaths
Nationalist Party of Australia members of the Parliament of Tasmania
Liberal Party of Australia members of the Parliament of Tasmania
Members of the Tasmanian House of Assembly
English emigrants to Australia
People from Dewsbury
Mayors of Launceston, Tasmania
Politicians from Launceston, Tasmania